Dikelocephalidae is a family of trilobites, that lived during the Upper Cambrian. Relatively large eyes close to the glabella, is a shared characteristic. The following genera have been assigned to this family:

Berkeia
Blandicephalus
Briscoia
Camaraspoides
Dikelocephalus
Elkia
Goumenzia
Hoytaspis
Iranella
Kasachstanaspis
Monocheilus
Olimus
Osceolia
Parabriscoia
Patalolaspis
Princetonella
Pterocephalops
Randicephalus
Stigmacephalus
Taebaeksaukia 
Walcottaspis

References

 
Dikelokephaloidea
Trilobite families
Cambrian first appearances
Cambrian extinctions